22nd London Film Critics Circle Awards
13 February 2002

Film of the Year: 
 Moulin Rouge! 

British Film of the Year: 
 Gosford Park 

The 22nd London Film Critics Circle Awards, honouring the best in film for 2001, were announced by the London Film Critics Circle on 13 February 2002.

Winners
Film of the Year
Moulin Rouge!

British Film of the Year
Gosford Park

Foreign Language Film of the Year
Amélie • France

Director of the Year
Alejandro González Iñárritu – Amores perros

British Director of the Year
Gurinder Chadha – What's Cooking?

Screenwriter of the Year
Joel and Ethan Coen – The Man Who Wasn't There

British Screenwriter of the Year
Richard Curtis, Andrew Davies and Helen Fielding – Bridget Jones's Diary

Actor of the Year
Billy Bob Thornton – The Man Who Wasn't There

Actress of the Year
Nicole Kidman – Moulin Rouge! and The Others

British Actor of the Year
Ewan McGregor – Moulin Rouge!

British Actress of the Year
Judi Dench – Iris

British Supporting Actor of the Year
Paul Bettany – A Knight's Tale

British Supporting Actress of the Year
Helen Mirren – Gosford Park and Last Orders

British Newcomer of the Year
Colin Farrell – Tigerland

Dilys Powell Award
Charlotte Rampling

External links
IMDB
Official Website

References

2
2001 film awards
2001 in London
2001 in British cinema
February 2002 events in the United Kingdom